2022 China earthquake may refer to:

2022 Qinghai earthquake, in January 2022
2022 Ya'an earthquake, in June 2022

See also
List of earthquakes in 2022
List of earthquakes in China